is a former Japanese football player.

Playing career
Mita was born in Miyagi Prefecture on October 5, 1969. After graduating from Osaka University of Commerce, he joined Gamba Osaka in 1992. Although he debuted and played 10 matches as midfielder in 1994 season, he could not play many matches. In 1996, he moved to his local club Sony Sendai in Regional Leagues. In 1998, the club was promoted to Japan Football League. He retired end of 2001 season.

Club statistics

References

External links

1969 births
Living people
Osaka University of Commerce alumni
Association football people from Miyagi Prefecture
Japanese footballers
J1 League players
Japan Football League (1992–1998) players
Japan Football League players
Gamba Osaka players
Sony Sendai FC players
Association football midfielders